John Langton (died 1337) was a chancellor of England and Bishop of Chichester.

Life
Langton was a clerk in the royal chancery, serving as the first Master of the Rolls from May 1286, and became chancellor in 1292. He obtained several ecclesiastical appointments (including as Vicar of St. Mary's Church, Horncastle), but owing to the resistance of Pope Boniface VIII he failed to secure the bishopric of Ely in 1298, although he was supported by King Edward I of England and visited Rome to attain his end. Resigning his office as chancellor in 1302, he was chosen Bishop of Chichester on 5 April 1305, consecrated bishop on 19 September 1305, and again became chancellor shortly after the accession of Edward II in 1307. Langton was one of the ordainers elected in 1310, and it was probably his connection with this body that led to his losing the office of chancellor about this time. He continued, however, to take part in public affairs, mediating between the king and Thomas, 2nd Earl of Lancaster in 1318, and attempting to do so between Edward and his rebellious barons in 1321. He died on 19 July 1337. Langton built the chapterhouse at Chichester, and was a benefactor of the University of Oxford.

Citations

References

 
 
 

Year of birth missing
1337 deaths
Lord chancellors of England
Bishops of Chichester
14th-century English Roman Catholic bishops
Clerks
Masters of the Rolls